Pterolophia nitidomaculata is a species of beetle in the family Cerambycidae. It was described by Maurice Pic in 1944.

References

nitidomaculata
Beetles described in 1944